FanDuel Racing (formerly TVG2 and HRTV) is an American sports-oriented digital cable and satellite television network.  It is part of the TVG Network and is owned by Paddy Power Betfair. Dedicated to horse racing, it broadcasts events from U.S. and international racetracks, as well as a range of English and Western horse competitions, news, original programming and documentaries

History
Horse Racing Television (HRTV) was launched on January 1, 2003 by the Magna Entertainment Corp. providing coverage of races at the 13 company-owned racetracks and programming from 60 other tracks. Magna used the network to promote their Xpressbet wagering system.

The network was previously known as HRTV, and owned by the Stronach Group. In 2007, Stronach sold 50% of the network to Churchill Downs Incorporated. In February 2015, HRTV was acquired by Betfair, owner of the competing TVG Network. HRTV was consolidated into TVG Network's Los Angeles facilities, and re-branded as TVG2 on October 28, 2015. The move to TVG's facilities also allowed the network to begin broadcasting in high definition.

In September 2022, the network was relaunched as FanDuel Racing, consistent with its sister-network's rebrand as FanDuel TV.

List of HRTV commentators
Scott Hazelton, Kurt Hoover, Christina Blacker, Matt Carothers, Todd Schrupp, Dave Weaver, Mike Joyce, Rich Perloff, Simon Bray, Donna Brothers, Nick Hines, Frank Miramahdi, Tom Cassidy, Joaquin Jaime, Paul Lo Duca, Peter Lurie, and Britney Eurton.

Programming

Racing programming
Programming on HRTV includes regular and special stakes races from Santa Anita Park, Churchill Downs, Gulfstream Park, Arlington Park, Pimlico Race Course, NYRA, and numerous other top U.S. and international racetracks.
 Inside Information
 Clubhouse Turn
 Drive Time
 Horse Racing All-Access
 Horseracing Today
 International Racing
 Morning Line
 Pick 6 Central
 Race Night
 Racing Coast to Coast
 Starting Gate
 Television Games
 The Quarters
 The Works
 Trackside Live
 TVG Classic

English programming
HRTV also features events in the world of English riding, such as show jumping, dressage, eventing and carriage driving.  Coverage includes the Aachen World Horse Festival, FEI World Cup Jumping, Dressage events, and the Horse Shows in the Sun (HITS) $1,000,000 Grand Prix Triple Crown of Show jumping.
 CHIO Aachen
 For the Love of Horses
 Polo Masters
 Alltech National Horse Show
 HITS AIG $1 Million Grand Prix
 HITS Great American $1 Million Grand Prix
 HITS Saugerties Zoetis $1 Million Grand Prix 
 The Hampton Classic
 Ridin' High America
 A Rider's Story
 The Saddle Club

Western Programming
Western horse-related programming includes rodeos sanctioned by the Professional Rodeo Cowboys Association, National Reining Horse Association events from around the world, US- based Cutting, Roping, and Barrel Racing competitions, and programming on recreational activities such as trail riding.
 Ridin' Horses with Kerry Kuhn
 Riding to Win
 Join Up
 Palm Partnership Training
 Charles Wilhelm Ultimate Foundation Horsemanship
 America's Favorite Trail Horse
 Diamonds & Dirt
 Richard Winters Horsemanship
 Cactus Reining Classic

References

Horse racing mass media
Sports television networks in the United States
Television channels and stations established in 2003